Hardy (Gerhard) Hanappi (born December 4, 1951), son of Gerhard Hanappi, is a European political economist. He is ad personam Jean Monnet Chair for Political Economy of European Integration and professor at the Institute of Statistics and Mathematical Methods in Economics of the TU Wien.

Career
Previously, he was deputy head of Socioeconomics at the Austrian Academy of Sciences, and director of the Ludwig Boltzmann Institute for Monetary Economics (LB-Society Vienna). He was Research Fellow at the International Centre of Electronic Commerce (ICEC, Seoul, Korea) and professorial research associate at the SOAS, University of London. In 2010 he founded the Vienna Institute for Political Economy Research (VIPER).
Hanappi has served as scientific development officer in the board of the European Association for Evolutionary Political Economy (EAEPE) from 2004 to 2017. He also was member of the board of the International Joseph A. Schumpeter Society and of the extended board of the Verein für Socialpolitik. Since 2003 he holds a Jean Monnet Chair granted by the European Commission.

Editing activities
Hardy Hanappi published and edited several books and numerous articles, has been a member of the editorial board of several journals, such as the Journal of Evolutionary Economics (JEE, Germany), the Evolutionary and Institutional Economics Review (EIER, Japan), and the Forum for Social Economics (FSE, USA).

Intellectual influences
His work combines interpretations of Hegelian, Marxian, and Schumpeterean ideas and aims at the construction of (partially game-theoretic) simulations for contemporary issues in global political economy to inform policy making. His work on the European unification process is paralleled by a strong interest in methodological questions. His most recent research interest concerns the development of quantum political economy. He is married to professor Edeltraud Hanappi-Egger, has three children and lives in Vienna.

Selected works 
*
Advances in Evolutionary Institutional Economics, (with Wolfram Elsner) Edward Elgar, 2008,  
Varieties of Capitalism and New Institutional Deals Regulation, Welfare and the New Economy, (with Wolfram Elsner) Edward Elgar, 2008,  
South-East Europe in Evolution, Routledge, 2015, 
Society and Economics in Europe, (with Savvas Katsikides), 2016, Springer, 
Evolutionary Political Economy in Action, (with Savvas Katsikides and Manuel Scholz-Wäckerle), Routledge, 2017,

References

External links 
 Hardy Hanappi's official website at TU Wien
 Hardy Hanappi's publication page at TU Wien
 Personal Homepage
 Hardy Hanappi's academia.edu profile
 Hardy Hanappi's Google Scholar profile
 Vienna Institute for Political Economy Research (VIPER)
 Homepage of the European Association for Evolutionary Political Economy(EAEPE)
 Homepage of the International Schumpeter Society (ISS)
 Kürschners Deutscher Gelehrten-Kalender Online

Austrian economists
Political economists
Academics of SOAS University of London
Writers from Vienna
Living people
1951 births